Red (Taylor's Version) is the second re-recorded album by American singer-songwriter Taylor Swift. Released via Republic Records on November 12, 2021, as a part of Swift's countermeasure against the purchase of the masters of her back catalog, the album is the re-recording of Swift's fourth studio album, Red (2012), and follows the first re-recording, Fearless (Taylor's Version) (2021).

The 30-track Red (Taylor's Version) includes re-recorded versions of 20 songs from the deluxe edition of Red; the 2012 charity single "Ronan"; the 10-minute-long, unabridged version of "All Too Well"; Swift's own recordings of "Better Man" (2016) and "Babe" (2018); and six previously unreleased "From the Vault" tracks. Swift and Christopher Rowe produced the album with a majority of the original producers, with new inputs from Aaron Dessner and Jack Antonoff amongst others. Gary Lightbody and Ed Sheeran returned to provide guest vocals, with Phoebe Bridgers and Chris Stapleton as new additions.

Met with widespread acclaim, reviews commended Red (Taylor's Version) for Swift's vocals, enhanced production quality, and the new tracks. Contemporaneous critics described it as a classic pop record with a country core, infusing rock and electronic flairs, whilst examining various dynamics of love, life, loss and heartache. The album broke a string of commercial records, including the biggest vinyl sales week in MRC Data history and the Spotify record for the most single-day streams for an album by a female artist. It topped the charts in Argentina, Australia, Canada, Ireland, New Zealand, Norway, Scotland, and the United Kingdom. In the United States, it was Swift's fourth number-one on the Billboard 200 chart in less than 16 months, making her the fastest artist to collect four number-one albums.

Swift promoted the album with televised appearances on NBC and a self-directed All Too Well: The Short Film. 28 of its tracks charted on the US Billboard Hot 100, garnering the record for the most single-week new entries by an artist; "All Too Well (10 Minute Version)" debuted atop the chart, becoming Swift's eighth number-one on the Hot 100 and the longest chart-topper of all time. "I Bet You Think About Me" and "Message in a Bottle" became country and pop radio singles, respectively. Publications dubbed Red (Taylor's Version) as a key pop culture moment of 2021. It received various accolades, including a Billboard Music Award, two American Music Awards, and three Grammy Award nominations.

Background 

Taylor Swift's fourth studio album, Red, was released on October 22, 2012, by American independent record label Big Machine Records. It witnessed Swift expand beyond her country roots and explore mainstream pop, incorporating a variety of genres. The effort was met with generally positive reviews and widespread commercial success. It garnered Swift's first number-one song on the US Billboard Hot 100, the album's lead single "We Are Never Ever Getting Back Together", and other successful singles in 2012 and 2013, such as "I Knew You Were Trouble", "22" and "Everything Has Changed". Red became Swift's first number-one album in the UK, and her album with the most UK top-10 singles so far. Over the years, the album collected critical praise for showcasing Swift's artistry and versatility. It became one of the most acclaimed albums of the 2010s decade, appearing on many decade-end best-music lists. Rolling Stone placed it at number 99 on its list of the 500 Greatest Albums of All Time. As of June 2021, Red has moved over 7.5 million album-equivalent units in the US alone.

As per her contract with Big Machine, Swift released six studio albums under the label from 2006 to 2017. In late 2018, the contract with the label expired; she hence withdrew from Big Machine and signed a new recording deal with Republic Records, a division of Universal Music Group, which secured her the rights to own the masters of the new music she will release. In 2019, American businessman Scooter Braun and his company Ithaca Holdings acquired Big Machine. As part of the acquisition, ownership of the masters to Swift's first six studio albums, including Red, transferred to Braun. In August 2019, Swift denounced Braun's purchase of the label, and announced that she would re-record her first six studio albums, so as to own their masters herself. In November 2020, Braun sold the masters to Shamrock Holdings, an American private equity firm owned by the Disney estate, under the conditions that Braun and Ithaca Holdings will continue to financially profit from the albums. Swift began re-recording the albums in November 2020.

Fearless (Taylor's Version), the first of her six re-recorded albums, was released on April 9, 2021. It achieved critical and commercial success, and debuted at number one on the Billboard 200 chart as the first re-recorded album in history to top the chart, a return to the number-one spot 13 years after the original release in 2008. All of its singles, "Love Story (Taylor's Version)", "You All Over Me", and "Mr. Perfectly Fine", peaked inside the top 10 of the Billboard Hot Country Songs, the first of which was her first number-one on the chart since "We Are Never Ever Getting Back Together" and made her only the second artist in history to top the chart with both the original and re-recording of the same song, after "I Will Always Love You" by Dolly Parton.

Music and lyrics

Composition 
Music critics characterized Red (Taylor's Version) as a pop and country album. The songs incorporate eclectic styles from synth-pop to arena rock with both acoustic instruments and electronic elements. Tracks 1–20 are re-recordings of all the songs on the original Red, and track 21, "Ronan (Taylor's Version)", is a re-recording of a charity single Swift had released in 2012. All of the re-recorded tracks are musically identical to their original 2012 recordings, except "Girl at Home" which has been reworked into an electropop and synth-pop song. The re-recorded tracks feature a subtly sharper production and emphasize the instruments that, according to Carrie Battan from The New Yorker, resemble live performances. Critics noted Swift's vocals on Red (Taylor's Version) are more mature and resonant compared to the original.

Tracks 22–30 are labeled "From the Vault", which are songs Swift had written but did not make the final cut of the 2012 album. While all of the "From the Vault" tracks consist of unreleased songs, two songs—"Better Man" and "Babe"—are songs that had been written by Swift and recorded by Little Big Town in 2016 and Sugarland in 2018 respectively.

Songs "From the Vault" 
"Better Man" is a banjo-led country ballad that incorporates mandolin and strings with lyrics about the aftermath of a painful breakup. "Nothing New" is a folk duet with Phoebe Bridgers, with lyrics dealing with insecurities around aging, and the "unfair social expectations on young women". "Babe" is a ska pop song with slide guitar, keyboards, brass, and percussion. Its lyrics describe the missteps in a dissolving relationship.

"Message in a Bottle" is an upbeat dance-pop track about the beginnings of a romantic connection. "I Bet You Think About Me" is a country pop song featuring background vocals by Chris Stapleton, and a prominent harmonica. It has tongue-in-cheek lyrics deriding an ex-lover's luxurious and pretentious lifestyle. "Forever Winter" is a power pop song opening with energetic brass. Swift's vocals in the song are characterized by "nuanced, wide-ranging", fast-paced, breathy notes of syllables, set to horns, flutes, and guitars. Lyrically, "Forever Winter" is directed to a friend of Swift with mental health struggles.

"Run" is an acoustic, indie folk-leaning duet with Ed Sheeran. It is guided by a twiddling guitar and orchestral compositions, while its lyrics consist of romantic gestures. "The Very First Night" is an uptempo dance-pop song driven by electronic programming and banjo in which Swift wishes she could go back in time to make a moment perfect. "All Too Well (10-Minute Version)", Swift's longest song in her entire discography, is a slow ballad driven by a thudding and insistent bass guitar, and additional verses, chorus with a downtempo outro. Its lyrics take a more feminist proposition compared to the five-minute version, and incorporates the popular William Shakespeare quote "All's Well That Ends Well".

Marketing

Artwork 
The cover artwork of Red (Taylor's Version) depicts Swift wearing red lipstick, a beige peacoat and a burgundy-colored "Matti" fisherman velvet cap, seated in a vintage 1932 Chevrolet Cabriolet convertible with an autumnal background. Janessa Leoné designed the cap which quickly sold out on Leoné's website. Swift also wears a customized Red ring on the cover, designed by jeweler Cathy Waterman; she wore Waterman's signature Love ring, gifted to her by Waterman's daughter Claire Winter Kislinger in 2011, while writing the original Red (2012).

Release
On June 18, 2021, Swift revealed that Red (Taylor's Version), the re-recorded issue of Red, would be released on November 19, 2021, and would contain all 30 songs that were meant to be on the 2012 version. She also teased the original, 10-minute-long version of the fan-favorite track "All Too Well", which had been highly requested by fans, as part of the track listing, which was "probably a 20-minute song" according to American songwriter Liz Rose, who had co-written some tracks on Swift's first two studio albums, Taylor Swift (2006) and Fearless (2008). Alongside the announcement, pre-orders for the digital album were made available.

On June 27, English singer-songwriter Ed Sheeran appeared on The Official Big Top 40, where he confirmed his involvement with Red (Taylor's Version), saying he re-recorded "Everything Has Changed"—his duet with Swift on Red. Three days later, Swift's 2012 charity single, "Ronan", was also confirmed as a track on the album by Swift's co-writer and the mother of the song's subject, Maya Thompson, via her blog. On August 5, Swift posted a cryptic video across her social media, teasing a word puzzle for the fans to solve; it spelled out "Chris Stapleton", "Phoebe Bridgers", "Babe", "Better Man", and "All Too Well Ten Minute Version". Concurrently, pre-orders for the album's CDs went up on Swift's website. She posted the official track listing on August 6. Before releasing any song from Red (Taylor's Version), Swift released "Wildest Dreams (Taylor's Version)" on September 17, a track set to appear on the re-recording of her 2014 studio album, 1989. She said she saw "Wildest Dreams" trending on TikTok and thought fans should have her version.

On September 30, Swift announced Red (Taylor's Version) would be released on November 12, a week earlier than scheduled. She confirmed the album's vinyl LPs would also be shipped the same week. A snippet of the title track, "Red (Taylor's Version)", featured in a teaser video posted by Swift on October 24, sporting a red dress, the Red ring from the album cover, alongside an array of red clothes and accessories. On November 5 via Good Morning America, Swift revealed a teaser for All Too Well: The Short Film, which is based on and titled after the namesake song, screening on November 12 alongside the album. The teaser showed a vintage car driving past a road bounded by autumnal woods, and it was written and directed by Swift starring herself, Sadie Sink, and Dylan O'Brien. On November 11, the official film poster was revealed on her social media, followed by a short teaser of the album's 24th track, "Babe (Taylor's Version)", on Tumblr.

Swift released four six-song compilations, Red (Taylor's Version): Could You Be the One Chapter, Red (Taylor's Version): She Wrote a Song About Me Chapter, Red (Taylor's Version): The Slow Motion Chapter and Red (Taylor's Version): From The Vault Chapter on January 13, 18, 25 and 31, 2022, respectively.

Promotion
Swift promoted the album on all three late-night shows of American television network NBC which were all taped at 30 Rockefeller Plaza; she appeared on the talk shows The Tonight Show Starring Jimmy Fallon and Late Night with Seth Meyers that aired back-to-back on November 11, followed by the album's release at midnight. She appeared as the musical guest of the live sketch comedy show Saturday Night Live on November 13, her fifth appearance on the show, where she performed the 10-minute version of "All Too Well". The first live performance of "All Too Well (10 Minute Version)" was at Lincoln Center, New York City, on November 12, following the premiere of Swift's self-directed All Too Well: The Short Film, which stars Sadie Sink and Dylan O'Brien. Starbucks partnered with Swift to commemorate the release of Red (Taylor's Version), which coincided with the company's "red cup holiday season"; customers were able to order Swift's favorite coffee drink by simply ordering a "Taylor's Latte", whereas her music, including the album, were played inside Starbucks stores.

Singles 

On November 15, 2021, "I Bet You Think About Me" featuring Chris Stapleton was serviced to U.S. country radio stations as a single from the album. On the same day, "All Too Well (10 Minute Version)" with a digital cover artwork was made available for download on Swift's webstore as a promotional single. The song debuted atop the Billboard Hot 100. It became Swift's eighth number-one on that chart and the longest number-one song in history, surpassing the previous record-holder Don McLean's "American Pie (Parts I and II)". "Message in a Bottle" impacted U.S. pop radio later that month.

Critical reception 

Red (Taylor's Version) received widespread acclaim from music critics, who praised the enhanced production and Swift's vocals. At Metacritic, which assigns a normalized rating out of 100 to reviews from professional publications, the album received a weighted mean score of 91 based on 16 reviews, indicating "universal acclaim"; it is Swift's highest-rated project on the site and the second-highest rated album of 2021, behind Carnage by Australian musicians Nick Cave and Warren Ellis.

In a rave review, Lydia Burgham of The New Zealand Herald hailed Red (Taylor's Version) as Swift's magnum opus. Rolling Stone music critic Rob Sheffield wrote "the new Red is even bigger, glossier, deeper, casually crueler", powered by Swift's adult voice. Helen Brown of The Independent stated Red (Taylor's Version) is a "better, brighter version of a terrific pop album". NME Hannah Mylrea praised the album's newly added tracks, and highlighted the sharper production quality and the "instrumentation being brought further into focus". Beth Kirkbride, writing for Clash, said that, with the new additions, Red (Taylor's Version) is a "medley of genres" toying with various styles. She described its subject matter as "an exercise in catharsis" that retreads like a storybook of Swift's formative years.

Kate Solomon of I wrote that Swift's voice is "leagues better now" and "the vocal furniture that she adds to the songs are like her revelling in that knowledge, flexing newly limber muscles." Under the Radar reviewer Andy Von Pip commended Red (Taylor's Version) for having a sharper production and "richer" vocal performances than Red without losing the seriousness and emotional heft of its subject matter. Variety Chris Willman called its vault tracks "a collection of songs that doesn't have a real dud". Reviewing for The Line of Best Fit, Paul Bridgewater opined that Red (Taylor's Version) "balances fan service alongside an insightful documentation of one of modern pop's best songwriters at a key juncture in her career", and added that Swift has carefully curated the expanded tracklist without devolving from the album's original appeal. Slant Magazine critic Jonathan Keefe said that Red (Taylor's Version) is a testament to the growth of Swift's musicality and praised the album's instrumental quality for giving its songs "a stronger emotional resonance".

Calling Red (Taylor's Version) a "highly rewarding listen" for both fans and casual listeners and "another towering victory" for Swift after Fearless (Taylor's Version), Bobby Olivier of Spin praised all aspects of the album—the vocal performances, songwriting, and production. Consequence Mary Siroky felt the expanded record functions as a closure to the original album, allowing Swift to "finish the story on her terms". Receiving the coveted "Best New Music" honor from Pitchfork, critic Olivia Horn said Red (Taylor's Version) contains Swift's signature "ecstatic, expressive vocals, tart humor, vivid imagery, and tender attention to the nuances of love and loss", and makes an artistic statement about revisiting the past, "both the flattering and the less flattering bits". The Atlantic Spencer Kornhaber said Swift "continues to push herself to new places as she doubles down on the things that make her beloved".

Melissa Reguieri, in her USA Today review, appreciated the versatile musicality, strong vocals, meticulous replication, and enhanced production quality of Red (Taylor's Version), as well as regarding the album an "intriguing study" of Swift's lyrical proficiency. Sputnikmusic called the album "an absolute triumph" for the insight of its musical and lyrical approach, and criticized their own "immature" review of the album in 2012, confirming "Swift's observations about love and life at age twenty-two were simply amazing". The Guardian writer Laura Snapes stated that Swift's voice is richer and more mature in the re-recorded album, but its lack of twang "slightly blunts the rabid, deliciously vindictive edge that fueled the original's tumultuous depiction of heartbreak".

Accolades
Red (Taylor's Version) received many accolades of the music industry, such as placements on best-of lists. At the 2022 Billboard Music Awards, Swift received seven nominations, including wins for Top Country Album nomination for Red (Taylor's Version), Top Country Artist, Top Country Female Artist, and Top Billboard 200 Artist. At the American Music Awards of 2022, Swift won in all of the six categories for which she was nominated including Artist of the Year, Favorite Pop Female Artist, and Favorite Country Female Artist. "All Too Well (10 Minute Version)", All Too Well: The Short Film, and "I Bet You Think About Me" were nominated for Song of the Year, Best Music Video, and Best Country Song, respectively, at the 65th Annual Grammy Awards, with All Too Well: The Short Film winning for Best Music Video.

Commercial performance 
Upon release Red (Taylor's Version) broke several streaming records. It became the most-streamed album in a day from a female artist on Spotify, with more than 90.8 million global opening-day streams, surpassing the previous record of 80.6 million by Swift's own Folklore (2020). Bolstered by the album's strong performance, Swift also became the most streamed woman in a single day—with more than 122.9 million global streams on the platform across her entire discography—and the first woman in Spotify history to amass 100 million streams in a day. The album moved over 1.2 million copies globally in its first week. All of the album's tracks appeared on the Billboard Global 200 chart as 28 new entries, alongside "Enchanted" (2010), "Blank Space" (2014) and "Wildest Dreams (Taylor's Version)" (2021), giving Swift a sum of 31 songs charting in the same week (November 27, 2021); 25 of those were in the top 100 region. At the end of the year, Swift was the most streamed woman on Spotify in 2021, and the second most streamed act behind Puerto Rican rapper Bad Bunny. The International Federation of the Phonographic Industry (IFPI) reported that Swift was the world's best selling soloist and female artist of 2021, for a third consecutive year. The album sold 1.14 million copies in 2021.

United States 
Within five days of its release, Red (Taylor's Version) sold over 500,000 album-equivalent units, including 325,000 album sales, which marked 2021's largest sales week for an album already, surpassing Swift's own Evermore (2020). Of those sales, 112,000 were in the vinyl LP format, breaking the record for the largest vinyl sales week for an album in the history of MRC Data (also held previously by Evermore). Concurrently, Swift had three of the four largest album sales weeks of 2021, with Red (Taylor's Version), Evermore and Fearless (Taylor's Version).

Upon completion of its full tracking week, Red (Taylor's Version) debuted at number one on the Billboard 200 with 605,000 units, marking the third largest week of 2021, behind 30 by Adele (839,000) and Drake's Certified Lover Boy (613,000). The first-week sum consists of 303.23 million on-demand streams, the largest streaming week of 2021 for an album by a woman, the second-largest ever after Ariana Grande's 2019 album Thank U, Next  (307.1 million streams), and the biggest for a country album, surpassing Morgan Wallen's 2021 album Dangerous: The Double Album (240.18 million). The album opened with 369,000 pure album sales, of which 114,000 were vinyl LP sales, and marked the largest sales week for a country album since Luke Bryan's Crash My Party sold 528,000 copies in 2014. It marked Swift's tenth Billboard 200 chart-topper, making her the second woman to score that many number-one albums after Barbra Streisand, who has 11. Swift also became the fastest soloist to earn four number-ones on the Billboard 200 (less than 16 months), breaking Elton John's 46-year-old record. The album further topped the Top Country Albums as Swift's seventh number-one and spent 7 weeks at the top, helping Swift surpass Shania Twain as the longest reigning female artist of the chart with 98 weeks atop it. Red (Taylor's Version) ranked second on the best-selling albums list of 2021, alongside Fearless (Taylor's Version), Evermore and Folklore in the top 10.

26 of the album's tracks entered the Billboard Hot 100 simultaneously, setting the records for the most debuts on the Hot 100 in a single week and the most simultaneous Hot 100 entries by a female artist, both of which were held by Swift herself with the release of Lover (2019). Her career total entries increased to 164, extending her record for the most Hot 100 entries by a female artist. Four of those tracks landed inside the Hot 100's top 40 region, bringing Swift's sum of top-40 entries to 85—the third highest sum in history, surpassing Elvis Presley. "All Too Well (Taylor's Version)", carried by the success of its 10-minute rendition, arrived atop the Hot 100 chart as Swift's eighth number-one song in the US. Swift became the first act in history to debut at number-one on both the Billboard 200 and Hot 100 charts simultaneously in three different occasions, following "Cardigan" and Folklore in August 2020 and "Willow" and Evermore in December 2020.

Elsewhere 
Red (Taylor's Version) opened at the number one spot of the Billboard Canadian Albums, scoring Swift her tenth consecutive number-one album in Canada. All of its tracks debuted on the Canadian Hot 100 chart together, with "All Too Well (Taylor's Version)" at number one, "State of Grace (Taylor's Version)" at number 9, and nine other tracks in the top 40. Red (Taylor's Version) was the best-selling country album in Canada by a female artist in 2021. Overall, it was the fifth best-seller across all genres, and one of the top 10 best-selling digital, CD and vinyl albums.

In the United Kingdom, the album debuted at number one on the UK Albums Chart and moved over 72,000 units within its first week. It became Swift's eighth consecutive number-one album, tying her with Kylie Minogue as the female artists with the second most number-one albums in the UK, only behind Madonna (12). Red (Taylor's Version) earned the highest opening-week sales for a female artist in 2021, eclipsing Sour by Olivia Rodrigo (51,000 units).

It also topped the Irish Albums Chart as Swift's seventh number-one album in Ireland—the most for a female artist this millennium. The album debuted atop the chart alongside "All Too Well (Taylor's Version)" debuting atop the Irish Singles Chart, marking a "chart double". Additionally, "State of Grace (Taylor's Version)" and "Red (Taylor's Version)" arrived at numbers 7 and 9 on the singles chart, respectively.

In Australia, Swift achieved a chart double by topping both ARIA Albums and Singles charts simultaneously; she scored her ninth number-one album on the former with Red (Taylor's Version) and her second of 2021 following Fearless (Taylor's Version). Swift became the first artist in the history of the ARIA Charts to have four number-one albums in a span of two years. Additionally, she tied Eminem for the most consecutive number one albums on the ARIA Albums Chart, at nine each. "All Too Well (Taylor's Version)" debuted atop the singles chart as Swift's eighth Australian number-one song. It marked the fourth time she achieved a chart double, after 1989 and "Blank Space" in 2014, Folklore and "Cardigan", and Evermore and "Willow". Eleven other tracks from Red (Taylor's Version) also entered the ARIA Singles Chart the same week. The album debuted at number one on the New Zealand Albums Chart as well, as Swift's tenth number one album there. In Japan, the album debuted at number 15 on the Oricon Albums Chart, and on the Japanese Hot Albums Billboard Japan at number 16.

Impact 

Various brands and companies used their social media accounts to endorse the album; some of them added "(Taylor's Version)" to their Twitter usernames during the release week. Fitness equipment manufacturer Peloton announced that the album's songs will be used in their on-demand classes, such as of cycling, running, and yoga, upon popular demand. Paper wrote that Swift's impact was "felt across social media", with the brands "capitalizing on her momentum". Inc. said the companies leveraged the album's cultural relevance. Beauty company Cosmetify reported that Google searches for "red lipstick" increased 669 percent following the release of Red (Taylor's Version).

Media outlets and fans online dubbed Red (Taylor's Version) as part of a 2021 music trend called "Sad Girl Autumn" or "Sad Girl Fall", which refers to the release of melancholic and introspective music by female artists during autumn, such as Adele's 30 and Mitski's "The Only Heartbreaker"; it is a counterpart to "Hot Girl Summer", a catchphrase coined by American rapper Megan Thee Stallion with her 2019 song of the same name. Swift herself acknowledged the phenomenon by releasing an acoustic rendition of "All Too Well (10 Minute Version)" subtitled "Sad Girl Autumn Version".

The Wall Street Journal stated that Red (Taylor's Version) is "reshaping the music industry", highlighting how the re-recorded songs are outperforming their original counterparts on streaming services, going viral on TikTok, and landing "lucrative" licensing deals for usage in motion pictures. According to the newspaper, Universal Music Group—the parent company of Republic Records—implemented stricter terms in recording deals which effectively doubled the time before an artist can rerecord their music. Other changes in the contracts included increased royalty payments to artists following their demands for better revenue shares. Variety named Swift the "Queen of Stream" for setting multiple streaming records with the release of Red (Taylor's Version). Rolling Stone opined "it's no small feat" for a re-released album to score a number-one song, and said deluxe or special editions of albums are often "gimmicky", but Red (Taylor's Version) challenged that norm and evolved on the original album rather than attempting to replace it.

Publications have said the release of Red (Taylor's Version), "All Too Well (10 Minute Version)", the accompanying short film, and Swift's re-recording venture collectively is one of the biggest newsmakers and pop culture moments of 2021. Vogue called it a "multimedia, news-cycle-dominating release" and stated "nobody releases (or rereleases!) an album like Swift." The Recording Academy called Red (Taylor's Version) a pop phenomenon that defined 2021. Ms. and Slate journalists stated Red (Taylor's Version) is a testament to Red legacy, highlighting how some critics in 2012 called Red a sub-par album citing its "hyper-emotionality and obsessive romanticism" but eventually saw it as a "masterclass in pop songwriting and poetry ahead of its time". Ms. wrote the period's sexist scrutiny downplayed her artistry; Slate stated the media had no sympathy for Swift, painting her as a "boy-crazy, vengeful ex" and failing to assess Red without prejudice. Billboard named Swift the "Greatest Pop Star of 2021" for her "unequivocal" success that year. Swift was the highest-paid musician of 2021 globally, earning an estimated $65.8 million in take-home pay.

Track listing

Notes 
 signifies executive producer 
 signifies vocal producer
 All tracks on the standard edition are noted as "Taylor's Version"; tracks 22–30 are additionally noted as "From the Vault".
 The album's CD package consists of two discs; one containing tracks 1–16, and the other with tracks 17–30.

Personnel

Musicians

 Taylor Swift – vocals, background vocals (1–4, 6–9, 11–15, 17, 18)
 Amos Heller – bass guitar (1, 2, 4–9, 16, 20), synth bass (5, 6, 8), clapping (9)
 Matt Billingslea – drums, percussion (1, 2, 4–9, 16, 20, 21); vibraphone (1), drum programming (4, 6, 8), clapping (9)
 Max Bernstein – electric guitar (1, 2, 4, 9), synthesizer (4–6, 8, 9, 16, 20), acoustic guitar (7), steel guitar (16)
 Mike Meadows – electric guitar (1), synthesizer (1, 2, 4, 6, 8), Hammond B3 (2, 16), acoustic guitar (4–9, 11, 13, 16, 20), background vocals (5, 9), clapping (9), mandolin (9, 16), piano (21)
 Paul Sidoti – electric guitar (1, 2, 4–6, 8, 9, 16, 21), acoustic guitar (7), piano (20)
 Jonathan Yudkin – strings (1, 2, 17), bouzouki (2), violin (16)
 David Cook – piano (2, 5, 16)
 Dan Wilson – bass, guitar (3, 18); background vocals (3)
 Aaron Sterling – drums, percussion, programming (3, 18)
 Andy Thompson – electric guitar (3), keyboards (3, 18), bass, conductor, synth bass (18)
 Sara Mulford – piano (3, 18), synthesizer (18)
 Dan Burns – programming (4, 6, 8)
 Jacknife Lee – bass, guitar, keyboards, piano (10)
 Davide Rossi – string arrangement, cello, viola, violin (10)
 Matt Bishop – drums (10)
 Gary Lightbody – vocals, guitar (10); background vocals (14)
 Owen Pallett – string arrangement (10)
 Bebel Matsumiya – background vocals (11, 13)
 Jeff Bhasker – background vocals, synthesizer (11, 13)
 Ian Gold – drum programming (11, 13)
 Anders Mouridsen – electric guitar (11, 13)
 Alexander Sasha Krivtsov – acoustic bass guitar (12, 17), electric bass (15)
 Justin Derrico – acoustic guitar (12, 15, 17), bouzouki, electric guitar (15); ukulele (17)
 Nate Morton – drums (12, 15, 17), drum programming (15)
 Paul Mirkovich – piano, synthesizer (12, 15, 17); synth bass (12, 17), drum programming (15, 17)
 Ed Sheeran – vocals, acoustic guitar (14, 28); background vocals (14)
 Butch Walker – background vocals, bass, drums, guitar, keyboards, percussion (14)
 Pete Amato – drum programming (15)
 Charlie Judge – accordion (16)
 Caitlin Evanson – background vocals (16, 22)
 Liz Huett – background vocals (17, 22)
 Dan Lawonn – cello (18)
 Kirsten Whitson – cello (18)
 Ruth Marshall – cello (18)
 Charlie Block – double bass (18)
 David Campbell – string arrangement (18)
 Sam Bergman – viola (18)
 Valerie Little – viola (18)
 Allison Ostrander – violin (18)
 Conor O'Brien – violin (18)
 Erika Hoogeveen – violin (18)
 Felicity James – violin (18)
 Huldah Niles – violin (18)
 Kate Bennett – violin (18)
 Mary Alice Hutton – violin (18)
 Natalia Moiseeva – violin (18)
 Natsuki Kumagai – violin (18)
 Troy Gardner – violin (18)
 Elvira Anderfjärd – background vocals, bass, drums, keyboards, programming (19, 25)
 Aaron Dessner – acoustic guitar, bass guitar, electric guitar, keyboards, piano (22, 23, 26); synthesizer (22, 23, 28), drum programming (22, 28)
 Josh Kaufman – electric guitar (22, 26, 28), lap steel guitar (22, 26), acoustic guitar, mandolin (22); harmonica (26)
 London Contemporary Orchestra – orchestra (22, 26, 28)
 Orchestra leader – Galya Bisengalieva
 Conductor – Robert Ames
 Cello – Jonny Byers, Max Ruisi, Oliver Coates
 Double bass – Dave Brown
 Viola – Clifton Harrison, Matthew Kettle, Stephanie Edmundson, Zoe Matthews
 Violin – Anna Ovsyanikova, Anna de Bruin, Antonia Kesel, Charis Jenson, Charlotte Reid, Eloisa-Fleur Thorn, Galya Bisengalieva, Guy Button, Natalie Klouda, Nicole Crespo O'Donoghue, Nicole Stokes, Zara Benyounes
 James Krivchenia – drums, percussion (22, 26, 28)
 Clarice Jensen – cello (23)
 Yuki Numata Resnick – violin (23)
 Phoebe Bridgers – vocals (23)
 Jack Antonoff – acoustic guitar, bass, electric guitar, keyboards (24, 27, 30); Mellotron, percussion, programming (24, 27, 30); drums (24, 27), 12-string acoustic guitar (27), slide guitar (30)
 Mikey Freedom Hart – acoustic guitar (24), celesta, Hammond B3 (24, 30); electric guitar, slide guitar, synthesizer (24, 27); bass, pedal steel (27); baritone guitar, organ (30), piano, Wurlitzer organ (30)
 Sean Hutchinson – drums, percussion (24, 27, 30)
 Evan Smith – flute, saxophone (24, 27, 30); synthesizer (30)
 Michael Riddleberger – percussion (24, 27, 30)
 Cole Kamen-Green – trumpet (24, 27)
 Shellback – guitar, keyboards, programming (25)
 Chris Stapleton – vocals (26)
 Mark Foster – background vocals (27)
 Thomas Bartlett – keyboards, synthesizer (28)
 Espen Lind – bass (29)
 Freddy Holm – dobro, guitar, keyboards (29)
 Torstein Lofthus – drums (29)
 Amund Bjørklund – keyboards (29)
 Bobby Hawk – strings (30)

Technical

 Taylor Swift – executive producer
 Randy Merrill – mastering
 Şerban Ghenea – mixing (1–21, 24, 25, 27, 29, 30)
 Jonathan Low – mixing, recording (22, 23, 25, 28, 30); engineering (23, 28)
 Bryce Bordone – mix engineering (1–9, 11–21, 24, 25, 27), mixing assistance (10, 29)
 Derek Garten – engineering, editing (1, 2, 4–7, 9, 12, 15–17, 20, 21); vocal engineering (22)
 John Hanes – engineering (10, 29)
 Ian Gold – engineering (11, 13)
 Aaron Dessner – engineering (23, 28), recording (22, 23)
 Bella Blasko – engineering, recording (23, 28)
 Will Maclellan – engineering (23, 28)
 Cole Kamen-Green – engineering (24, 27)
 David Hart – engineering (24, 27, 30)
 Evan Smith – engineering (24, 27, 30)
 Jack Antonoff – engineering, recording (24, 27, 30)
 John Rooney – engineering, engineering assistance (24, 27, 30)
 Laura Sisk – engineering, recording (24, 27, 30)
 Michael Riddleberger – engineering (24, 27, 30)
 Mikey Freedom Hart – engineering (24, 27, 30)
 Sean Hutchinson – engineering (24, 27, 30)
 Jon Gautier – engineering (30)
 David Payne – recording (1, 2, 5, 7, 16, 20, 21)
 Aaron Sterling – recording (3, 18)
 Andy Thompson – recording (3, 18)
 John Mark Nelson – recording (3, 18)
 Sara Mulford – recording (3, 18)
 Jacknife Lee – recording (10)
 Matt Bishop – recording, editing (10)
 Travis Ference – recording, additional engineering (12, 15, 17); editing (15)
 Butch Walker – recording (14)
 Justin Derrico – recording (15), additional engineering (12, 15, 17)
 Miles Hanson – recording (18)
 Elvira Anderfjärd – recording (19)
 Jeremy Murphy – recording (22, 28)
 Espen Lind – recording (29)
 Mike Hartung – recording (29)
 Christopher Rowe – vocal engineering
 Sam Holland – vocal engineering (4, 8)
 Robert Sellens – vocal engineering (14, 28)
 Tony Berg – vocal production (23)
 Austin Brown – editing, engineering assistance (1, 2, 5, 7, 9, 16, 20, 21)
 Dan Burns – additional engineering (1, 2, 4, 5, 7–9, 16, 20, 21)
 Paul Mirkovich – additional engineering (12, 15, 17)
 Pete Amato – additional engineering (15)
 Daniel Ficca – additional engineering (18)
 Josh Kaufman – additional engineering (26)
 Jeff Fitzpatrick – engineering assistance (17)
 Jon Sher – engineering assistance (24, 27, 30)
 Lauren Marquez – engineering assistance (24, 27, 30)
 Michael Fahey – engineering assistance (26)

Charts

Weekly charts

Year-end charts

Certifications

Release history

See also 
 List of Billboard 200 number-one albums of 2021
 List of UK Albums Chart number ones of the 2020s
 List of UK Album Downloads Chart number ones of the 2020s
 List of number-one albums of 2021 (Australia)
 List of number-one albums of 2021 (Canada)
 List of number-one albums of 2021 (Ireland)
 List of number-one albums from the 2020s (New Zealand)
 List of number-one albums in Norway

Footnotes

References

Cited literature
 
 

2021 albums
Taylor Swift albums
Republic Records albums
Albums produced by Taylor Swift
Albums produced by Shellback (record producer)
Albums produced by Jack Antonoff
Albums produced by Aaron Dessner
Albums produced by Butch Walker
Albums produced by Jacknife Lee
Albums produced by Jeff Bhasker
Albums produced by Dan Wilson (musician)
Country albums by American artists
Pop albums by American artists
Albums produced by Chris Rowe